The Canadian Soccer Club is a Uruguayan football club based in Montevideo. It is a newly founded club that plays in the Uruguayan Segunda División.

History 
Canadian S.C. was founded in late 2010 by A Uruguayan living in Canada from the need of the community of Uruguayans living in Canada to have a team representing them back home. Their supporters group is known as La Banda del Norte (the Band of the North) or LBDN and their main rival is Club Atlético Torque.

The club made its official debut in the Uruguayan Segunda División Amateur on 2 October 2011 against Basañez, on a 2–1 home win. Los canadienses won the Clasura title in their second season, earning them a promotion to the Uruguayan Segunda División.

Titles 
 Uruguayan Segunda División Amateur: 2012–13

Notes

External links 
  

Football clubs in Uruguay
Association football clubs established in 2010
2010 establishments in Uruguay
Canada–Uruguay relations
Latin American Canadian culture